Iazuri River may refer to:

 Iazuri, a tributary of the Șomuzul Mare in Suceava County
 Iazuri or Iazurile, a tributary of the Dobra in Hunedoara County

See also 
 Iaz River (disambiguation)